The 2023 Horizon League Women's Basketball Tournament was the final event of the 2022–23 women's basketball season for the Horizon League. It began on February 28, 2023, and ended on March 7; first-round and quarterfinal games were played at the home courts of the higher seeds, with all remaining games at Indiana Farmers Coliseum in Indianapolis. As the tournament winner, Cleveland State received the conference's automatic berth into the NCAA Tournament.

Seeds 
All of the teams will participate in the tournament with the top-five teams receiving byes to the quarterfinals.

Schedule

Bracket 

* denotes overtime period

References 

2022–23 Horizon League women's basketball season
Horizon League women's basketball tournament
Basketball competitions in Indianapolis
College basketball tournaments in Indiana
Horizon League women's basketball tournament
Horizon League women's basketball tournament
Women's sports in Indiana